The M/71 is a large Egyptian metal-cased anti-tank blast mine based on the Russian TM-46 landmine. It is found in Egypt and Somalia. The mine is normally painted sand colored. The fuse is susceptible to overpressure and the mine is easily detectable.

Specifications
 Weight: 
 Explosive content:  of TNT
 Diameter: 
 Height: 
 Operating pressure:

References
 Jane's Mines and Mine Clearance 2005-2006

anti-tank mines